Sleepwalker is the debut extended play by musical duo Kylie and Garibay, composed of Australian singer-songwriter Kylie Minogue and American record producer Fernando Garibay. Musically, it is influenced by electronica and, in a departure for Minogue reggae and dancehall. Its lyrical content begins a story arc, from loss to recovery, concluded by the second Kylie + Garibay EP.

The EP was released via SoundCloud on 24 September 2014, to coincide with the start of Minogue's 2014–2015 Kiss Me Once Tour, where a specially produced short film was played before the beginning of the show. The short film was directed by William Baker, and was uploaded to Minogue's YouTube channel on 19 November 2014. The short film contains three of the tracks from the EP, with the exclusion of "Chasing Ghosts". The songs were originally part of the sessions for Minogue's 2014 album, Kiss Me Once, but never saw inclusion on any version of the album.

Track listing
All tracks produced by Fernando Garibay.

Release history

References

2014 debut EPs
Albums produced by Fernando Garibay
Kylie and Garibay albums